The Banu Khazrun were a family of the Maghrawa that ruled Tripoli from 1001 to 1146.

History
During the 10th century, the region of Ifriqiya and Tripolitania came under the control of the Fatimid Caliphate. After the Fatimids moved their capital to Cairo in the 970s, they left their territories in the Maghreb under the control of their vassals, the Zirid dynasty. After 1001, Tripolitania broke away from Zirid control under the leadership of Fulful ibn Sa'id ibn Khazrun, a leader of the Banū Khazrūn tribe, from the Maghrawa Berber  confederation. This established the Banu Khazrun dynasty that lasted up to the mid-12th century. 

Fulful fought a protracted war against Badis ibn al-Mansur, the Zirid emir, and sought outside help from the Fatimid caliphs themselves in Cairo and even from the Andalusi Umayyads in Córdoba. After his death in 1009, the Zirids were able to retake Tripoli for a time. The region nonetheless remained effectively under control of the Banu Khazrun, who fluctuated between practical autonomy and full independence, often playing the Fatimids and the Zirids against each other. The Zirids finally lost Tripoli to them in 1022.

In 1143, Roger II of Sicily tried and failed to take Tripoli from Muhammad ibn Khazrun. By 1146, a famine drove the city's inhabitants to expel the Banu Khazrun. This afforded Roger the opportunity to finally capture the city in 1146 or 1147. The dynasty's rule came to an end at this time and the Normans extended their influence to the coastal cities in this region.

References

Citations

Sources 

 
 

History of Tripoli, Libya
Berber dynasties
11th century in Africa
12th century in Africa